K Lalrinfela (born 11 March 2000), commonly known by his nickname Mafela, is an Indian professional footballer who plays as an attacking midfielder for Aizawl in the I-League.

Career

Early career 
Born in Hnahthial, Mizoram, Mafela joined Mohun Bagan Football Academy in 2015 after going through necessary trials conducted by the academy. After a year of staying in the academy, he looked for a seemingly better academy elsewhere hoping that further more improvements will come from such an academy. In 2017, he joined Bengaluru B and stayed there till his graduation. He had played for Bengaluru U18. He also participated in Subroto Cup, 2015 and B.C Roy Trophy as well as represented Mizoram in Santosh Trophy Qualifiers, 2021.

Aizawl 
Before joining Aizawl in 2022, Mafela had played for other football clubs such as Ramakrishna Club and Swaraj FC. In July 2022, he signed a two-year professional contract with the The People's Club. He made his professional debut for Aizawl against TRAU on 15 November, at the Rajiv Gandhi Stadium in Aizawl. He played for 90 minutes in the first match of the 2022–23 I-League season and scored his debut professional goal at 48th minute and won the Hero of the Match Award. Besides having scored one goal, Mafela has registered two assists to his name in the current 2022 I League, one against Sreenidi Deccan FC and another one against Mumbai Kenkre FC.     

He sustained an injury to his foot in a match against Mohammedan SC (Kolkata) on 13th January, 2023 and therefore missed the next two away matches - one against Sudeva Delhi FC on 16th January, 2023 and another one against NEROCA FC on 21st January, 2023.

Even though not being fully recovered from the injury, he appeared in the home match against Mohammedan SC (Kolkata) on 26th January, 2023 where Aizawl FC won by one goal.

Career statistics

Club

References 

2000 births
Living people
Footballers from Mizoram
Indian footballers
Aizawl FC players